Georgi Filipov  (born 12 August 1985 in Varna) is a former Bulgarian footballer who played as a midfielder. He retired in 2013, at the age of 28, due to injury.

Career
Filipov started his career in Spartak Varna's youth and made his debut for the club's first team at the age of 19 on 14 February 2004 in a 3–0 defeat to Belasitsa Petrich. He scored his first goal during the next 2004–05 season on 13 November 2004 in a 3–2 home win against Vidima-Rakovski.

Georgi left Spartak in June 2007, joining Greek side Pierikos, however, the coach could not find a place in his squad for the winger, and he was allowed to join Chernomorets Balchik at the end of the season.

In June 2010, Filipov signed a two-year contract with newly promoted A PFG side Kaliakra Kavarna. On 31 July he scored Kaliakra's first ever A PFG goal, in the 1–0 win over Slavia Sofia on the opening day of the 2010–11 season at the Ovcha Kupel Stadium. He scored his second league goal on 13 November 2010 as Kaliakra defeated Sliven 2000 1–0. One month later Filipov scored his third goal for Kaliakra in the third round of the 2010–11 Bulgarian Cup, a 3–1 defeat to Pirin Blagoevgrad at Hristo Botev Stadium.

On 22 October 2011 Filipov broke his leg in a match against Levski Sofia. Manager Radostin Trifonov later said he expected Filipov to be absent for a minimum of six months.

Club statistics

References

External links
Player Profile at Soccerway

1985 births
Living people
Bulgarian footballers
First Professional Football League (Bulgaria) players
PFC Spartak Varna players
Pierikos F.C. players
FC Chernomorets Balchik players
PFC Kaliakra Kavarna players
Expatriate footballers in Greece
Association football midfielders